Petrus Josephus Jacobus "Jaak" Gabriëls (born 22 September 1943) is a Belgian politician and member of the Flemish Liberals and Democrats (VLD) ( or VLD). He graduated in 1965 at the Catholic University of Leuven as Master of Philosophy and Arts. He started his political career as a Provincial Councillor for Limburg from 1974 to 1977. From 1977 till the last day of December 2012 he was the Mayor of Bree, and from 1977 he was Member of the Chamber of Representatives. From 1995 to 1999 he was a Member of the Flemish Parliament.

He was the leader of the People's Union ( or VU) from 1986 to 1992 and was a founding member of the VLD. He also was Federal Minister of Agriculture  and middle class (from 1999 to 2001) and Flemish Minister of Economy, Foreign Trade and Housing (from 2001 to 2003). He again became a Member of the Flemish Parliament in 2003 and he became a Minister of State in 2004.

References

1943 births
Living people
Open Vlaamse Liberalen en Democraten politicians
Ministers of Agriculture of Belgium
Belgian Ministers of State
KU Leuven alumni
People's Union (Belgium) politicians